Thirakoil is a village in Tellar taluk in Tiruvannamalai district in the Indian state of Tamil Nadu. The major occupation of the people living at this place is agriculture.

Etymology
It is believed that this place got its name from the word "thurugal" meaning rock. Later it modified to "thirakol"  then became Thirakoil.

Information

 Name of the Place = Thirakoil
 Taluk             = Tellar
 District          = Tiruvannamalai
 State             = Tamil Nadu
 Country           = India
 Coordinates       = 12°27'9"N   79°29'55"E
 Area              = 1 km2
 Population        = 953 (2011)
Maximum People = Yadhava

Location
Thirakoil is located 15 km southwest of Vandavasi, 7 km from Ponnur Kundkundar Philosophical Center. Thirakoil hill runs 1 km in northeast direction.

Transportation
Only private bus facilities are available to the nearest place Desur and Kilputhur. One has to walk approximately one km to reach Thirakoil.

Thirakoil Hill and the Digambara Jain Temple

There are three small caves present in the hill. One at the mid-South, other two at west and east side of the hill. These caves were used as Jain abodes during 8th Century.These caves were naturally formed in which Jain Monks lived. There is a monolithic stone of 25 feet high in which idols of four tirthankars (Mahavira, Parshva or Parsavanathar, Rishabha or Kilaku Rishabanathar and Chandranathar)  were carved nicely at the four sides. Until the 10th century this place was called Thandapuram. Raja Raja Chola I's inscriptions of 1007 A. D. quotes these cave abodes as Sankaraippalli and Mai Sutthappalli . Bhagavan Mahavira's idol is worshipped at the temple which is recently built.

See also
 Jainism
 Tamil Jain
 List of Jain temples
 Jain Sculpture
 Jain temple

References
Leaflet provided by Thirakoil Digambara Jain temple committee
http://www.tamiljains.org/
http://ddws.gov.in/ddwsimis/RuralWaterSupply/Reports/ReportYSRHabitationDistrict.aspx?districtId=0447&districtname=TIRUVANNAMALAI
L. Kumar, "Battle of Wandewash-250" (வந்தவாசிப் போர்-250), Akani Publications, Compiled by M. Rajendiran and A. Vennila, 2010 (In Tamil)

External links

Archaeological sites in Tamil Nadu
Villages in Tiruvannamalai district
Jain temples in Tamil Nadu
Jain rock-cut architecture
8th-century Jain temples